The Spedalingo Altarpiece' or Ognissanti Altarpiece is a 1518 oil on panel painting by Rosso Fiorentino, now in the Uffizi in Florence, which acquired it in 1900. It was commissioned by Leonardo Buonafede, "spedalingo" (i.e. rector) of the Hospital of Santa Maria Nuova in Florence. The contract was dated 30 January 1518. The painting was intended for the St John the Baptist chapel in Ognissanti according to the will of Francesca de Ripoi, a Catalan widow.

To the left are John the Baptist (patron of Florence and of the chapel) and Antony the Great, whilst to the right are saint Stephen (patron saint of the chiesa di Grezzano, with one of the stones with which he was martyred still in his head) and Jerome (with a book).

Sources
Elisabetta Marchetti Letta, Pontormo, Rosso Fiorentino, Scala, Firenze 1994. 

Paintings of the Madonna and Child
1518 paintings
Paintings in the collection of the Uffizi
Fiorentino
Fiorentino
Paintings depicting John the Baptist
Altarpieces
Angels in art
Books in art
Paintings by Rosso Fiorentino